The 2019 Florida Gators football team represented the University of Florida in the 2019 NCAA Division I FBS football season. The Gators played their home games at Ben Hill Griffin Stadium in Gainesville, Florida, and competed in the Eastern Division of the Southeastern Conference (SEC). They were led by second-year head coach Dan Mullen.

Coming off a 10-win season that ended in a victory in the Peach Bowl in Mullen's first year, Florida began the 2019 season ranked eighth in the preseason AP Poll. They opened the schedule by rekindling their rivalry with Miami in a game played in Orlando, winning 24–20. The Gators won their first six games, including a win over then-No. 7 Auburn, before falling on the road to then-No. 5 LSU. Three weeks later, they fell again to Georgia in Jacksonville. Florida ended the regular season in second in the East Division behind Georgia at 10–2 (6–2 SEC), and were invited to the Orange Bowl to play ACC runner-up Virginia. The Gators won the bowl game, 36–28, to end the season with 11 wins, and were ranked sixth in the final AP Poll.

Feleipe Franks began the year as the Gators' starting quarterback, but he suffered a season-ending ankle injury in the third game of the season against Kentucky. He was replaced by Kyle Trask, who finished the year with 2,941 yards and 25 touchdowns, and had the conference's second best passer rating (156.1). Tight end Kyle Pitts was named first-team all-conference. Florida's defense ranked second in the SEC in points and yards allowed, and was led by first-team all-conference defensive end Jonathan Greenard, who led the conference in sacks (10) and tackles for loss (16). Cornerback C. J. Henderson was also named first-team all-conference by the coaches.

Preseason

Position key

Recruits
The Gators signed a total of 25 recruits in the 2019 recruiting class.

SEC Media Days
The 2019 SEC Media Days were held July 15–18 in Birmingham, Alabama. In the preseason media poll, Florida was projected to finish in second behind Georgia in the East Division.

Preseason All-SEC teams
The Gators had seven players selected to the preseason all-SEC teams.

Offense

2nd team

La'Mical Perine – RB

Defense

1st team

Jabari Zuniga– DL

C. J. Henderson – DB

2nd team

David Reese II – LB

Specialists

2nd team

Tommy Townsend – P

Kadarius Toney – All-purpose

3rd team

Evan McPherson – K

Schedule
Florida announced its 2019 football schedule on September 18, 2018. The 2019 schedule consists of 6 home, 4 away, and 2 neutral games in the regular season.

Schedule Source:

Rankings

Game summaries

vs. Miami (FL)

UT Martin

at Kentucky

Tennessee

Towson

Auburn

Special throwback uniform

at LSU

at South Carolina

vs. Georgia

 Sources:

After its road victory against South Carolina, Florida faced Georgia in the 97th iteration of their rivalry game, played at the neutral site TIAA Bank Field in Jacksonville. Georgia won 24–17 to extend its series winning streak to three games.

Georgia won the opening coin toss and elected to defer to the second half. On the opening drive, Florida converted a third down, but Georgia took over at their own 40-yard line after an incomplete pass by Kyle Trask on fourth and inches. On their sixteen-play drive, Georgia made four third down conversions and scored first with a field goal by Rodrigo Blankenship. The next Florida drive was a three-and-out, with Trask being sacked once, but Georgia's next drive was stopped by the Florida defense and they were forced to punt. After another three-and-out by Florida, Georgia marched down the field with three third down conversions, ending their drive with a touchdown pass from Jake Fromm to Dominick Blaylock to bring the score to 10–0 with under five minutes left in the first half. Florida answered with an Evan McPherson field goal, but this was negated by another Blankenship field goal near the end of the half, bringing the score to 13–3 in favor of Georgia.

To open the second half, Georgia made a nine-play drive that included a one-handed catch by Brian Herrien of a pass from Fromm, capping it with Blankenship's third field goal of the game to extend their lead to 13 points. Both teams punted on their next drives, but Florida rallied with a nine-play drive that resulted in their first touchdown, made by Van Jefferson off a 23-yard pass by Trask. This narrowed the score differential to a touchdown with just under fourteen minutes left in the game, but on the next drive Georgia pulled away when Lawrence Cager completed a 52-yard pass from Jake Fromm for a touchdown. Together with a successful 2-point attempt, also from Fromm to Cager, this extended the Georgia lead to fourteen points. A 75-yard Florida drive ended with a Trask 2-yard touchdown pass to Freddie Swain with just over three minutes remaining in the game. Returning Florida's punt to their own 32-yard line, Georgia ran out the clock to seal their victory.

After the game, Florida dropped from sixth to tenth in the AP Top 25, while Georgia rose by two spots. Their victory gave Georgia uncontested first place in the SEC East, with now two-loss Florida in second.

Vanderbilt

at Missouri

Florida State

vs. Virginia

Personnel

Roster

  Redshirt
  Injury

Coaching staff

Awards and honors

Players drafted into the NFL

References

Florida
Florida Gators football seasons
Orange Bowl champion seasons
Florida Gators football